The Advanced Traffic Management System (ATMS) field is a primary subfield within the Intelligent Transportation System (ITS) domain. The ATMS view is a top-down management perspective that integrates technology primarily to improve the flow of vehicle traffic and improve safety. Real-time traffic data from cameras, speed sensors, etc. flows into a Transportation Management Center (TMC) where it is integrated and processed (e.g. for incident detection), and may result in actions taken (e.g. traffic routing, DMS messages) with the goal of improving traffic flow. The National ITS Architecture defines the following primary goals and
metrics for ITS:
 Increase transportation system efficiency,
 Enhance mobility,
 Improve safety,
 Reduce fuel consumption and environmental cost,
 Increase economic productivity, and
 Create an environment for an ITS market.

History
In 1956, the National Interstate and Defense Highways Act initiated a 35-year $114 billion program that designed and constructed the Interstate highway system. This hugely successful program was mostly complete by 1991, and the era of build-out was over. In the mid to late 1980s transportation officials from Federal and State governments, the private sector, and universities began a series of informal meetings discussing the future of transportation. This included meetings held by the California Department of Transportation (Caltrans) in October 1986 to discuss technology applied to future advanced highways. In June 1988 in Washington, DC, the group formalized its structure and chose the name Mobility 2000. In 1990, Mobility 2000 morphed into ITS America, the main ITS advocacy and policy group in the US. The initial name of ITS America was IVHS America and was changed in 1994
to reflect a broader intermodal perspective. The 1991 Intermodal Surface Transportation Efficiency Act (ISTEA) was the first post-build-out transportation act. It initiated a new approach focused on efficiency, intelligence, and intermodalism. It had a primary goal of providing “the foundation for the nation to compete in the global economy”. This new mixture of infrastructure and technology was identified as an Intelligent Transportation System (ITS) and was the centerpiece of the 1991 ISTEA act. ITS
is loosely defined as “the application of computers, communications, and sensor technology to surface transportation”. Subsequent surface transportation bills have continued ITS funding and development. In 2005 the SAFETEA-LU (Safe, Accountable, Flexible, Efficient Transportation Equity Act: A Legacy for Users) surface transportation spending bill was signed
into law.

Functional areas
 Real-time traffic monitoring
 Dynamic message sign monitoring and control
 Incident monitoring
 Traffic camera monitoring and control
 Active Traffic Management (ATM)
 Chain control
 Ramp meter monitoring and control
 Arterial management
 Traffic signal monitoring and control
 Automated warning systems
 Road Weather Information System (RWIS) monitoring
 Highway advisory radio
 Urban Traffic Management and Control

Systems
 IRIS open-source ATMS Project
 Georgia Navigator
 Kimley-Horn Integrated Transportation System (KITS)

See also 
 Traffic optimization
 Speed limit: Variable speed limits
 Variable-message sign
 Ramp meter
 PTV Group

References 

Transportation engineering
Intelligent transportation systems
Road traffic management